Virgil H. Cady (December 25, 1876 – April 27, 1934) was a politician in the State of Wisconsin.

Biography
Cady was born in Excelsior, Sauk County, Wisconsin on December 25, 1876 to William C. and Emogene Cady. He later moved to Baraboo, Wisconsin. On July 14, 1903, he married Margaret Pelley.

He died in Baraboo on April 27, 1934.

Career
Cady served as a member of the Wisconsin State Assembly in 1909 before unsuccessfully running for a seat in the U.S. House of Representatives from Wisconsin's 7th congressional district in 1914, losing to incumbent John J. Esch, and for Governor of Wisconsin in 1926, losing to Fred R. Zimmerman. He was a Democrat.

References

External links
The Political Graveyard

People from Richland County, Wisconsin
People from Baraboo, Wisconsin
1876 births
1934 deaths
Democratic Party members of the Wisconsin State Assembly